Chernobyl is the name of a Ukrainian city, the location of the 1986 Chernobyl nuclear disaster.

Chernobyl may also refer to:
 Chernobyl (Hasidic dynasty), which was named after the city

 Chernobyl disaster, a 1986 nuclear disaster
 Chernobyl Nuclear Power Plant, the site of the disaster
 Chernobyl (miniseries), an American–British television series
 Chernobyl: Zone of Exclusion, a Russian television series
 Chernobyl: Consequences of the Catastrophe for People and the Environment, a 2007 book by Alexey V. Yablokov, Vassily B. Nesterenko, and Alexey V. Nesterenko
 Chernobyl: Abyss, a 2021 Russian disaster film directed by and starring Danila Kozlovsky
 Chernobyl (novel), novel by Frederik Pohl dramatizing the disaster
 CIH (computer virus), sometimes known as Chernobyl

See also 
 Artemisia vulgaris, the common mugwort plant, for which the Ukrainian city is named